Abzy Dhakad is a Bhojpuri language entertainment channel that was owned by Skystar Entertainment Pvt Ltd.

Former shows 
Bhakti Uday
Dhakad Hit Ba
Bhakti Shandhya
Crime Stop

See also
List of Bhojpuri-language television channels

References

Skystar Entertainment
Television stations in Mumbai
Hindi-language television shows
Television channels and stations established in 2019
2019 establishments in India